The Rose Parrakeet was a single-seat sporting biplane produced in small numbers in the United States during the 1930s. It was a conventional design with staggered single-bay wings of equal span braced by N-struts. The cockpit was open, and the fixed tailskid undercarriage had divided main units. An unusual feature was the use of a single strut in place of the usual flying wires.

Development

Only eight Parrakeets were built by Rose, but the design proved a popular one with homebuilders in the 1950s. Rights to produce kits of the Parrakeet were purchased by Hannaford Aircraft in 1948, and the design was marketed as the Hannaford Bee with structural modifications to strengthen weak points. Kits were marketed right up to the point of Hannaford founder Foster Hannaford's death in 1971, and plans continued to be sold into the 1980s. In 1968, Doug Rhinehart obtained a licence from Jack Rose to produce five all-new Parrakeets.

Variants
Rose A-1 Parrakeet
various engines fitted to the prototype, including a 40hp Continental A-40, a Henderson, and a 50hp Menasco. Eight built of -1,-2 and -3  versions
Rose A-2F Parrakeet
50hp Franklin.
Rose A-2P Parrakeet
50hp Poyer.
Rose A-3F Parrakeet
 60hp Franklin.
Rose A-4 Parrakeet
Four built with Continental A-65 or Continental C-85 engines.
Rhinehart-Rose A-4C Parrakeet
Revived in the 1970s'fitted with a Continental O-200, five built.

Specifications (Rose A-1 Parrakeet)

References

 
 Rose Parrakeet Aeroplanes 1929 to present

1930s United States sport aircraft
Homebuilt aircraft
Biplanes
Single-engined tractor aircraft
Aircraft first flown in 1931